Listen is the fourth album from contemporary Christian music singer Cindy Morgan. It was released in 1996 by Word Records.  It moved further from dance-pop into a singer-songwriterly vein.

Track listing
All songs written by Cindy Morgan, except where noted.
 "The Master's Hand" – 3:55
 "God Is Love" – 3:25
 "They Say It's Love ('Stars')" – 3:36
 "Need" – 3:31
 "Jamie" – 3:01
 "Listen" (Morgan, Cova Morgan, Andrew Ramsey) – 3:46
 "The Promise" – 4:10
 "Lord We Come" – 0:58
 "Moon Days" (Morgan, Ramsey, Brent Bourgeois, Brent Lenthall) – 3:53
 "To Fly" – 3:55
 "Gravity" – 3:42
 "Will You Be There?" – 1:33

Trivia
 The lyrics to "Listen" were written by Cova Morgan, Cindy's father, in the 70s.

Personnel 
 Cindy Morgan – lead vocals, backing vocals, acoustic piano
 Brent Bourgeois – keyboards, additional acoustic piano (3), backing vocals
 Tom Howard – additional keyboards, string arrangements and conductor
 Gordon Kennedy – acoustic guitar, electric guitar, coral electric sitar
 Jerry McPherson – acoustic guitar, electric guitar, banjo, weird sounds
 Andrew Ramsey – acoustic guitar, electric guitar, backing vocals
 Brent Milligan – bass
 Aaron Smith – drums
 Raymond Boyd – percussion
 Brent Lenthall – percussion
 Mark Douthit – clarinet (3), clarinet arrangements (3), saxophone (6)
 Chris McDonald – trombone (6)
 Mike Haynes – trumpet (6)
 The Nashville String Machine – strings
 Molly Felder – backing vocals
 Adrian Bourgeois – additional backing vocals 
 Mary Ann Bourgeois – additional backing vocals (8)
 Clay Crosse – additional backing vocals (8)

Production 
 Produced by Brent Bourgeois
 Co-produced, Engineered and Mixed by Craig Hansen
 A&R Direction – Lynn Keesecker
 Assistant Engineers – Tim Coyle, Joe Hayden and Shane Wilson.
 Mix Assistant – Tim Coyle
 Recorded at The Sound Kitchen and Deer Valley Studio (Franklin, TN); re:think Studio and Javelina Recording Studio (Nashville, TN).
 Mixed at The Sound Kitchen 
 Mastered by Ken Love at MasterMix (Nashville, TN).
 Photography – Matthew Barnes
 Design – Gina R. Binkley
 Stylist – Christiév Carothers
 Hair and Make-up – Melanie Shelley

Charts

References

1996 albums
Cindy Morgan (singer) albums